Ha Jae-Hoon (born on February 10, 1965) is a former South Korea football player.

At the club side, he won the K-League 1989 with Yukong Elephants.
He was manager of Bucheon SK and Cheonan City FC.

Honours
Club
 Yukong Elephants
 K-League Winners : 1989

References

External links
 

1965 births
Living people
Association football defenders
South Korean footballers
Jeju United FC players
K League 1 players
Jeju United FC managers
South Korean football managers